Club Polideportivo Malpartida is a Spanish football team based in Malpartida de Cáceres, in the autonomous community of Extremadura. Founded in 1969, it plays in Regional Preferente, holding home games at Campo de Fútbol Vicente del Bosque.

Season to season

5 seasons in Tercera División

References

External links
Official website
Futbolme.com profile
fexfutbol.com profile

Football clubs in Extremadura
Divisiones Regionales de Fútbol clubs
Association football clubs established in 1969
1969 establishments in Spain